Florence is a city in Rankin County, Mississippi, United States. As of the 2010 Census, the population was 4,141. It is part of the Jackson Metropolitan Statistical Area.

Geography

The 2010 Census showed a population of 4,141, a 72.8% growth from the 2000 Census. The current city limits have grown northward towards Richland. Florence was the 12th fastest growing city in Mississippi at the 2010 Census. The city has grown both eastward and westward and will continue to expand towards the Pearl River, eventually stopping at the Pearl River, which separates Rankin County from Hinds County.

Demographics

2020 census

As of the 2020 United States Census, there were 4,572 people, 1,583 households, and 1,204 families residing in the city.

2010 census
The racial makeup of the city was 85.3% White, 13.1% African American, 0.1% Native American, 0.5% Asian, 0.3% from other races, and 0.7% from two or more races. Hispanic or Latino of any race were 1.1% of the population.

There were 1,558 households, out of which 42.5% had children under the age of 18 living with them, 55.6% were married couples living together, 13.4% had a female householder with no husband present, and 25.8% were non-families. 22.4% of all households were made up of individuals living alone, and 8.2% had someone living alone who was 65 years of age or older. The average household size was 2.64 and the average family size was 3.11.

In the city, the population was spread out, with 28.7% under the age of 18, 9.6% from 18 to 24, 33.2% from 25 to 44, 18.8% from 45 to 64, and 9.6% who were 65 years of age or older. The median age was 32 years. For every 100 females, there were 87.0 males. For every 100 females age 18 and over, there were 83.2 males.

The median income for a household in the city was $39,400, and the median income for a family was $46,250. Males had a median income of $35,030 versus $24,327 for females. The per capita income for the town was $18,162. About 9.6% of families and 10.8% of the population were below the poverty line, including 14.8% of those under age 18 and 12.0% of those age 65 or over.

Education
The city of Florence's public schools are served by the Rankin County School District. This includes Florence High School.

Public schools
 Steen's Creek Elementary School (Grades K-2)
 Florence Elementary School (Grades 3-5)
 Florence Middle School (Grades 6-8)
 Florence High School (Grades 9-12)
 McLaurin Elementary School (Grades Pre-K-6)
 McLaurin High School (Grades 7-12)

Colleges and universities
 Wesley College (Closed July 2010)

Notable people
 Robert Braddy - baseball player and coach
 Carl Corley - author and illustrator of fiction focused on homosexual life in rural environments.
 Paul McCoy - lead singer of the Christian Rock band 12 Stones.
 Tate Reeves - Governor of Mississippi.
 The Weeks - indie pop band.

References

Cities in Rankin County, Mississippi
Cities in Mississippi
Jackson metropolitan area, Mississippi